Geranium is a genus of 422 hardy flowering plant species.

Geranium may also refer to:

Plants
 Geraniales, a small order of flowering plants
 Geraniaceae, a family of flowering plants placed in the order
 Pelargonium, a genus of flowering plants formerly included in Geranium, and still commonly called geraniums
 Chenopodium botrys, feathered geranium or Jerusalem oak goosefoot
 Ixora spp, jungle geranium or West Indian jasmine
 Saxifraga stolonifera, strawberry geranium or creeping saxifrage
 Rosa moyesii 'Geranium', a shrub rose cultivar

Places
 Geranium, South Australia, a town in the Murraylands
 Geranium Plains, South Australia, a small town in the Mid North
 Geranium, Nebraska, a ghost town
 Geranium Township, Valley County, Nebraska
 "Geranium City", nickname of McDonough, Georgia
 Geraniums House, a landmark in Santa Felicidade, Brazil

Ships
 Géranium, a French 
 , an Arabis-class sloop launched in 1915, originally HMS Geranium
 , a  launched in 1940
 , a steamship used as a tugboat

Arts and media
 A Geranium, 1911 movie starring Adele De Garde
 Geranium, the character of Ruby Dandridge in the Judy Canova Show
 "Geranium", a poem by Mary Ellen Solt
 "Geranium" (Geranio), a waltz by Pedro Elías Gutiérrez
 "Geranium Plant", an episode of Pat Novak for Hire
 "Geraniums", a poem by Roger Nash
 "The Geranium", a short story by Flannery O'Connor

Other uses
 Geranium the First (Géranium Ier), the nickname of Pierre Bourque (politician), a Québec politician
 1227 Geranium, an outer main-belt asteroid
 "Geranium", a codeword for telescopes used in the letters of John Dobson (astronomer)
 Geranium red, a shade of red
 Geranium (restaurant), a restaurant in Denmark

See also
 Geranium oil, oil produced from Pelargonium graveolens
 List of Geranium species